Expedition Robinson was the Swiss version of the Swedish reality show Expedition Robinson and it debuted in 1999. Seeing the success of the Danish, Norwegian, and Swedish versions of the show TV3 in Switzerland decided to produce their own version of the show. Due to low ratings, the show was cancelled after just two seasons. At the time the show was cancelled the third season was nearly done being shot. Despite this the third season was never broadcast.

The name alludes to both Robinson Crusoe and The Swiss Family Robinson, two stories featuring people marooned by shipwrecks.

Format
The Robinson format was developed by Planet 24, a United Kingdom TV production company owned by Charlie Parsons and Bob Geldof. Their company Castaway Television Productions retained the rights to the concept when they sold Planet 24 in 1999. Mark Burnett later licensed the format to create the American show Survivor in 2000.

Sixteen contestants are put into a survival situation and compete in a variety of physical challenges. Early in each season two teams compete but later on the teams are merged and the competitions become individual. At the end of each show one contestant is eliminated from the show by the others in a secret "island council" ballot.

Seasons

References

External links
 Stefanie Lederman

Expedition Robinson
Switzerland
1999 Swiss television series debuts
2001 Swiss television series endings
1990s Swiss television series
2000s Swiss television series
German-language television shows
Swiss reality television series
TV3 (Swiss TV channel) original programming